The Kinološki savez Crne Gore, a member of the FCI, is an organization responsible for dog pedigree registration services in Montenegro. The organization also provides training services, judging for conformation shows, and many other services relating to dog showing.

References

External links
 

Fédération Cynologique Internationale
Kennel clubs